InterCaribbean Airways, Ltd. (formerly known as Air Turks & Caicos) is a regional airline, based in the Turks and Caicos Islands, a British Overseas Territory. The airline offers scheduled domestic and regional commercial passenger flight services and charter flight options from its hub in Providenciales International Airport, located on the island of Providenciales. Since its launch in 1991, its travel destinations have expanded to multiple Caribbean islands which include the following: Antigua, The Bahamas, British Virgin Islands, Cuba, Dominica, Dominican Republic, Haiti, Jamaica, Puerto Rico, St. Lucia, Barbados, Grenada, St. Vincent and the Grenadines and St. Maarten. InterCaribbean Airways gained operational rights within Jamaica as a non-Jamaican airline to operate domestic flights between the island's capitals, Kingston and Montego Bay.

History 

The airline was established in 1991 as InterIsland Airways, Ltd. In 2003, the company rebranded to become Air Turks & Caicos. The airline's travel destinations included Haiti, the Dominican Republic, Jamaica, the Bahamas and Puerto Rico.

By 1999, the company had grown to become a full-service airline. Up until this point, the owner of the company, Lyndon Gardiner, was acting as a pilot for the company. Due to the growth of the company, Lyndon Gardiner retired from his position as a pilot to run the company.

In 2008, Air Turks and Caicos merged with its competitor, SkyKing. The SkyKing brand was integrated into the Air Turks and Caicos operations on 22 October 2008 and by mid-2009 the airline continued operating with a single Air Operators Certificate.

In November 2013, after operating for 10 years as Air Turks & Caicos, the company rebranded itself as InterCaribbean Airways due to the increasing demand for airline travel in the Caribbean area.

By June 2019, InterCaribbean Airways, decided to add the larger and faster  Embraer ERJ-145 regional jet aircraft to its fleet.

In addition to the ERJ-145 regional jets, the airline currently operates Embraer EMB 120 Brasilia propjets, in addition to one Embraer EMB 120 aircraft, as well as a De Havilland Canada DHC-6 Twin Otter turboprop aircraft. InterCaribbean also previously operated the Britten-Norman BN-2A Islander twin prop aircraft. The Twin Otter aircraft joined the fleet in December 2015, while the Britten-Norman Islander aircraft has been retired.

In February 2023, InterCaribbean announced it will start flying from St. Kitts to Barbados' Grantley Adams International Airport. InterCaribbean will fly the service three times weekly on Sunday, Wednesday, and Friday on an Embraer-120 aircraft.

Destinations 
As of February 2023, InterCaribbean Airways operates scheduled flights to the following destinations within the Caribbean:

Fleet 
According to the airline's website, the InterCaribbean Airways fleet currently includes the following aircraft:

The airline leased Embraer EMB-120 Brasilia from October 2014 to February 2016 to Cayman Airways; for scheduled inter-island passenger flights in the Cayman Islands.  The airline acquired two Embraer 145 regional jets, which it began operating commercially from early June 2019, and has since acquired an additional ERJ-145 aircraft.

References

External links 

 

Airlines of the Turks and Caicos Islands
Airlines established in 1991
1991 establishments in North America